George Albert "Georgie" Jessel (April 3, 1898 – May 23, 1981) was an American actor, singer, songwriter, and film producer. He was famous in his lifetime as a multitalented comedic entertainer, achieving a level of recognition that transcended his limited roles in movies. He was widely known by his nickname, the "Toastmaster General of the United States," for his frequent role as the master of ceremonies at political and entertainment gatherings. Jessel originated the title role in the stage production of The Jazz Singer.

Early years 
Jessel was born to a Jewish couple, Joseph and Charlotte "Lottie" (née Schwarz) Jessel, on 118th Street in Harlem, New York City. By age 10, he was appearing in vaudeville and on Broadway to support his family after the death of his father, who was a playwright.

His mother, who worked as a ticket seller at the Imperial Theater, helped him form The Imperial Trio, a harmony group of ushers to entertain patrons of the theater, with Walter Winchell and Jack Wiener, using the stage names Leonard, Lawrence and McKinley, in their early teens (such usher-singer groups were common). At age 11, he was a partner of Eddie Cantor in a kid sketch and performed with him on stage until he outgrew the role at age 16. He later partnered with Lou Edwards and then became a solo performer.

Career

Vaudeville 
His most famous comedy skit was called "Hello Mama" or "Phone Call from Mama," which portrayed a one-sided telephone conversation. In 1919 he produced his own solo show, George Jessel's Troubles.

Jessel co-wrote the lyrics for a hit tune, "Oh How I Laugh When I Think How I Cried About You," and he performed in several successful comedy stage shows in the early 1920s. In 1921 he recorded a hit single, "The Toastmaster." He sometimes appeared in blackface in his vaudeville shows.

Film and broadcasting 
Jessel appeared in his first motion picture, the silent movie The Other Man's Wife (1919).  In 1924, he appeared in a brief comedy sketch in a short film made in the DeForest Phonofilm sound-on-film process.

In 1925, he emerged as one of the most popular leading men on Broadway with the starring role in the stage production of The Jazz Singer. The success of the show prompted Warner Bros.—after their success with Don Juan (1926) with music and sound effects only—to adapt The Jazz Singer as the first "talkie" with dialogue and to cast Jessel in the lead role. However, the studio refused his salary demands, so Jessel turned down the movie role, which was eventually played by Al Jolson. According to Jessel during an interview around 1980, Warner Bros. still owed Jessel money for earlier roles and lacked enough funds to produce this movie with a leading star. Jolson, the biographical inspiration for the movie, became the movie's main financial backer.

Jessel's next movie role was in Private Izzy Murphy (1926). Whereas Jolson's film career skyrocketed after the 1927 release of The Jazz Singer, Jessel remained in smaller movie roles, often intended for audiences fond of Jewish and other "ethnic" humor. He was elected to The Lambs Theatre Club in 1942.

In the middle 1940s, he began producing musicals for 20th Century Fox, producing 24 films in all in a career that lasted through the 1950s and 1960s. At the same time he became known as a host on the banquet circuit, famous for his good-natured wit aimed at his fellow celebrities. In 1946, he was one of the founding members of the California branch of the Friars Club. (A recording exists of an example of his "blue" work in front of a stag audience, although it was actually recorded at a roast hosted by the Friars' rival, the Masquers Club.) He also traveled widely overseas with the USO entertaining troops. As he grew older, he wrote eulogies for many of his contemporaries in Hollywood. He wrote three volumes of memoirs, So Help Me (1943), This Way, Miss (1955), and The World I Lived In (1975).

Jessel produced a number of Hollywood films, including The Dolly Sisters (1945), Nightmare Alley (1947), Golden Girl (1951) and The I Don't Care Girl (1953).

In the early 1950s, he performed on the radio in The George Jessel Show, which became a television series of the same name from 1953 to 1954.

Jessel was the emcee on the short-lived The Comeback Story, a 1954 reality show on ABC in which mostly celebrities shared stories of having overcome adversity in their personal lives. After he was replaced as emcee by Arlene Francis, the program soon folded.

Thereafter, Jessel guest-starred on NBC's The Jimmy Durante Show. In 1968, he starred in Here Come the Stars, a syndicated variety show. However, his attempt to extend his career was undermined by a perception that his style of comedy was outdated, as well as by his outspoken support of the American entry into the Vietnam War and of conservative political causes. He often crossed the era's stereotypical political lines with his support for the civil rights movement and criticism of racism and anti-Semitism. His outspoken political opinions were, at times, the source of scandal. In 1971, while being interviewed by Edwin Newman on The Today Show on NBC, he repeatedly referred to The New York Times as Pravda (the house organ of the Communist Party of the Soviet Union), and the interview was cut short.

His later film roles included a cameo as himself in Valley of the Dolls (1967), The Busy Body (1967) opposite Sid Caesar, and the controversial musical Can Heironymus Merkin Ever Forget Mercy Humppe and Find True Happiness? (1969) directed by and starring Anthony Newley. He made additional cameos in other all-star films such as The Phynx (1970) and Won Ton Ton, the Dog Who Saved Hollywood (1976).

Jessel was included as one of the "witnesses" interviewed in the 1981 film Reds by Warren Beatty. To gain perspective on the lives of Jack Reed and Louise Bryant (the two protagonists of the movie), Beatty began filming the "witnesses" as early as 1971.

Personal life 

In the 1930s, his personal life kept him in the public eye as much as his movies. On May 2, 1930, Jessel married Florence Courtney in Chicago. She divorced him on October 24, 1932, on the grounds of cruelty. On April 23, 1934, Jessel married silent movie star Norma Talmadge, causing a scandal because Talmadge was married at the time that they started their affair, and she obtained a Mexican divorce only ten days earlier. After their divorce on August 11, 1939, he caused another scandal by breaking into her house with a pistol and firing shots at her current lover. In 1940, he married a 16-year old showgirl, Lois Andrews, when he was 42. They had a daughter, Jerrilyn, before divorcing in 1942. In his 1975 autobiography, The World I Lived In, Jessel claimed he had affairs with actresses Pola Negri, Helen Morgan and Lupe Vélez.

In 1961, actress Joan Tyler filed a paternity suit against Jessel claiming he was the father of her daughter Christine. Jessel later admitted he was Christine's father and settled the suit out of court. As part of the terms of the settlement, Jessel agreed to pay Tyler $500 a month in child support.

In 1964, Jessel reportedly sexually groped Shirley Temple at the age of 35. According to Temple, he invited her to his office under the guise of discussing a recent role. During their meeting, Jessel put an arm around Temple, while taking off his pants. He then grabbed the 35 year-old Temple's breasts. She fought off his attempts by kicking him in the groin.

Death 
On May 23, 1981, Jessel died of a heart attack at the University of California at Los Angeles Medical Center at the age of 83. He was interred in the Hillside Memorial Park Cemetery in Culver City, California.

Honors and awards 
In 1969, the Academy of Motion Picture Arts and Sciences honored him for his charity work by awarding him the Jean Hersholt Humanitarian Award, a Special Academy Award. For his contribution to the motion picture industry, George Jessel has a star on the Hollywood Walk of Fame at 1777 Vine Street in Los Angeles.

Filmography

References

External links 

 
 
 
 George Jessel interviewed by Mike Wallace on The Mike Wallace Interview September 14, 1957

1898 births
1981 deaths
20th-century American male actors
20th-century American singers
Film producers from New York (state)
American male comedians
American male film actors
American male musical theatre actors
American male silent film actors
American male singer-songwriters
American male stage actors
American male television actors
20th-century American memoirists
Burials at Hillside Memorial Park Cemetery
Jean Hersholt Humanitarian Award winners
Jewish American male actors
Jewish American musicians
Jewish American male comedians
Male actors from New York City
Masters of ceremonies
People from the Bronx
Singer-songwriters from New York (state)
Vaudeville performers
Comedians from New York City
American male non-fiction writers
20th-century American comedians
20th-century American male singers
Conservatism in the United States
20th-century American Jews
Members of The Lambs Club